The term sanctus bell (or sacring bell) may refer to:

A particular type of church bell hung in a church tower or bell-cot
The small hand-held altar bell (or bells) which have colloquially assumed the same name